Stephan Hamann is an American psychologist and professor of psychology at Emory University in Atlanta, Georgia, where he has worked since 1996. His research focuses on understanding the neural basis of emotion, memory, and their interaction, using a combination of neuroimaging and neuropsychological approaches. He is currently Editor-in-Chief of the journal Neuropsychologia.

External links
Hamann's faculty page

References

21st-century American psychologists
Emory University faculty
University of California, Berkeley alumni
University of Toronto alumni
Living people
Year of birth missing (living people)